Manushyanu Oru Aamukham is a Malayalam debut novel by Subhash Chandran. The novel is set in Thachanakkara, a fictitious village in central Kerala, India, and has the central character named Jithendran. It was originally serialised in Mathrubhumi Weekly in 2009 and was published as a book by DC Books in 2010. The novel won numerous awards including the Kendra Sahitya Akademi Award (2014), Kerala Sahitya Akademi Award (2011), Odakkuzhal Award (2011), FOKANA Award (2012), Bhasha Institute's Basheer Puraskaaram (2012), Kovilan Puraskaaram (2012) and Vayalar Award (2015).

The work was released in English translated by Dr Fathima E.V, Published by HarperCollins titled A Preface to Man

References

External links
 Manushyanu Oru Amukham at DC Books official website

2010 Indian novels
Malayalam novels
Novels set in Kerala
Kerala Sahitya Akademi Award-winning works
DC Books books
Sahitya Akademi Award-winning works
2010 debut novels